Orient Township may refer to:

 Orient Township, Adair County, Iowa
 Orient Township, Michigan
 Orient Township, Faulk County, South Dakota, in Faulk County, South Dakota

Township name disambiguation pages